Honesty is an unincorporated community in Noble County, in the U.S. state of Ohio.

History
A post office called Honesty was established in 1898, and remained in operation until 1907.

References

Unincorporated communities in Noble County, Ohio
Unincorporated communities in Ohio